'Moherowe Berety' is the second track on the album Moherowe Berety by Big Cyc. It was released in 2006 by Universal Music Polska. A music video was made for this song, funded by Sabina Kluszczyński of Heavy Vision.

External links
 http://www.tekstowo.pl/piosenka,big_cyc,moherowe_berety.html
 https://www.youtube.com/watch?v=YjI_uNiGwDQ&list=PLHiFBb3mlYfFETEFw9hjHbEjyIJ2yHQM2&index=2

2006 songs